Homla is a river in the municipality of Malvik in Trøndelag county, Norway.

The Homla was first used by the timber industry to transport recently cut trees, but it is now just a small river with good fishing opportunities. Small-sized salmon and sea trout can be caught here.

Around the year 2000, there were plans for constructing a large dam over the river's largest waterfall, "Storfossen". Due to local opposition, these plans were eventually aborted.

See also
List of rivers in Norway

References

Malvik
Rivers of Trøndelag
Rivers of Norway